The following is a timeline of the history of Koblenz, Germany.

Prior to 19th century

 9 BCE - Military post established by Roman Drusus (approximate date).
 1018 CE - Henry II, Holy Roman Emperor gives Koblenz to Archbishop of Trier.
 1208 - Church of St. Castor built.
 1254 - Town walls built.
 1344 - Stone bridge built over Mosel.
 1359 - Koblenzer Schützengesellschaft (militia) formed.
 1469 - Population: 1,193.
 1688 - Town besieged by French forces.
 1698 - Jesuit College built.
 1725 - Merchants' Hall restored.
 1768 - Clemens Wenceslaus of Saxony becomes Archbishop-Elector of Trier
 1778 - Population: 7,475.
 1786 - Electoral Palace built.
 1794 - Town taken by French forces.
 1798 - Koblenz becomes "chief town of the Rhine and Mosel department."

19th century
 1813 -  becomes mayor.
 1814 - Town occupied by Russian forces.
 1815 - Koblenz Fortress construction begins near town.
 1822 - Town becomes seat of the Rhine province.
 1827 - Bürgerbibliothek (town library) founded.
 1832 - Ehrenbreitstein Fortress built near town.
 1840 - Population: 18,387.
 1849 - Coblenzer Zeitung newspaper in publication.
 1858 - Koblenz-Lützel station opens.
 1864 - Pfaffendorf Bridge built.
 1885 - Population: 31,669.
 1897 - Statue of Wilhelm I installed on the Deutsches Eck.

20th century
 1902 - Koblenz Hauptbahnhof (railway station) opens.
 1905 - Population: 53,902.
 1919 - Population: 56,676.
 1933 - Population: 65,257.
 1934
 Koblenz radio transmitter erected.
 TuS Koblenz football club formed.
 1935 - Thingplatz and Stadion Oberwerth (stadium) inaugurated.
 1943 - Koblenz becomes capital of Koblenz-Trier Gau.
 1946
 Koblenz becomes part of the Rhineland-Palatinate.
  becomes mayor.
 1953 - Pfaffendorf Bridge rebuilt.
 1961 - Population: 99,240.
 1976 - Fernmeldeturm Koblenz (telecommunications tower) erected near city.
 1991 - City partnered with Austin, Texas, USA.
 1992 - 2000th anniversary of founding of Koblenz.
 1994 -  becomes mayor.

21st century
 2001 - DB Museum opens.
 2004 -  opens.
 2010 -  becomes mayor.
 2011
 Koblenz Stadtmitte station opens.
 City hosts Federal Horticultural Show 2011.
 2012 - Population: 109,779.

See also
 Koblenz history
 
 Goloring, Bronze Age (1200–800 BCE) earthwork near Koblenz
 List of Archbishop-Electors of Trier

Other cities in the state of Rhineland-Palatinate:(de)
 Timeline of Mainz

References

This article incorporates information from the German Wikipedia.

Bibliography

in English
 
 
  (+ 1882 ed.)

in German
 
  (bibliography)

External links

 Links to fulltext city directories for Koblenz via Wikisource

 
koblenz
koblenz
Koblenz
Years in Germany